Princess Diana Margherita of Bourbon-Parma (Diane Marguerite de Bourbon-Parme in French; 22 May 1932 – 4 May 2020) was a French aristocrat and member of the House of Bourbon-Parma, a cadet branch of the Spanish royal family.

Biography 
Princess Diana was born in Paris on 22 May 1932 to Prince Gaetano of Bourbon-Parma, the youngest child of Robert I, Duke of Parma and Infanta Maria Antonia of Portugal, and Princess Margarete von Thurn und Taxis, the youngest child of Prince Alessandro, 1st Duke of Castel Duino and Princess Marie de Ligne. On 15 March 1955 she married Prince Franz Josef Hubertus Maria Meinrad Michael of Hohenzollern-Sigmaringen, son of Frederick, Prince of Hohenzollern, in a civil ceremony London. They later had a Catholic ceremony on 16 April 1955 in Krauchenwies. She gave birth to a son, Alexander, in 1957. She and Prince Franz Josef divorced in 1961 after it was revealed that the prince was not Alexander's biological father. The divorce was finalized on 19 January 1961 in Stuttgart. On 21 March 1961 she married her son's biological father, Hans Joachim Oehmichen, in Stuttgart. They had two more children, Gaetano and Maria, and had their marriage consecrated in the Catholic Church in 1992. Her first marriage was officially annulled by the Catholic Church on 17 January 1980. Her second husband died in 1995.

Princess Diana died in Bad Krozingen, Germany on 4 May 2020 from COVID-19.

References 

1932 births
2020 deaths
French people of German descent
French people of Italian descent
French people of Portuguese descent
French Roman Catholics
French expatriates in Germany
Princesses of Bourbon-Parma
Princesses of Hohenzollern-Sigmaringen
Deaths from the COVID-19 pandemic in Germany